Irwin Entertainment, Inc. is a television production company founded in 2004 by John Irwin. The Los Angeles, California based company specializes in reality, scripted, and live entertainment programming. Irwin Entertainment‘s credits include past VH1 reality series about addiction, Seasons 1-7 of Celebrity Rehab with Dr. Drew starring Drew Pinsky, Celebrity Rehab with Dr. Drew Reunion Special (2008) and 2 seasons of Sober House (2009). Irwin Entertainment also produces Couples Therapy, which 6th season aired during the Fall of 2015 on VH1.

John Irwin and Irwin Entertainment also produced NBC's Must See TV: A Tribute to James Burrows, which premiered to over 5.5 million  viewers on February 21, 2016. This iconic special reunited cast members from programs such as Friends, Cheers, Frasier, Will & Grace, Taxi, The Big Bang Theory, Mike & Molly, and Two and a Half Men.

Irwin Entertainment produced the VH1 docu-series, Make or Break: The Linda Perry Project, with accomplished singer, songwriter, and producer Linda Perry as she opened the doors to her Hollywood studio for the first time ever to re-launch her record label and mentor a group of young artists. Make or Break: The Linda Perry Project successfully aired during the summer of 2014 on VH1. The series earned a 2014 GLAAD Award Nomination for Outstanding Reality Program.

For Spike (TV network), Irwin Entertainment produced Coaching Bad with retired 2-time Super Bowl Champion and Super Bowl MVP Ray Lewis, who served as a mentor to bombastic youth coaches from around the United States. The 8 episode series premiered in January 2015 and featured Ray Lewis with anger management specialist Dr. Christian Conte as they put 9 coaches through an intense program to change their combative ways. The coaches, who come from a variety of different sports from all around the country, move into a Coaching Center in Los Angeles for intense retraining and reconditioning.

Irwin Entertainment is also the production company behind the new series for VH1 titled, Family Therapy with Dr. Jenn.   The series shines light on five celebrity families at various crossroads & as they undergo three weeks of intensive family therapy to work out their differences.

For NBC, Irwin produced Blake Shelton's not so Family Christmas, a Scripted Comedy Variety Special that aired on December 3, 2012. The Variety Special won the 2014 WGA Award in the “Comedy/Variety – Music, Awards, Tributes – Specials” category. For his second consecutive year (Dec. 2013, Dec. 2014) John Irwin produced NBC's New Year's Eve with Carson Daly," Live from Times Square. 

Irwin has Produced Comedy Specials with Nikki Glaser, Kevin Hart, David Spade, Daniel Tosh, John Mulaney, Artie Lange, Neal Brennan, Chris D'Elia, Steve Rannazzisi, Anthony Jeselnick, Nick Swardson, Norm Macdonald, Hannibal Buress, Tracy Morgan, Patton Oswalt, Trevor Noah, Nate Bargatze, Demetri Martin, Chris Hardwick, Patrice O'Neil, and Todd Barry.

Irwin Entertainment has also produced All Jacked Up, a series on CMT hosted by actor C. Thomas Howell. All Jacked Up featured stunts, sports, events and people  from around the country in 30 minute episodes.

The company also produced the first season of A Little Late with Lilly Singh, a late-night talk show on NBC.

John Irwin
Irwin Entertainment, Inc. President John Irwin founded the company following his experiences as a producer of several other television programs and specials. Irwin spent four years producing Late Night with Conan O'Brien, two years as a producer for MADtv, and five years as Vice President of Development and Production for Lorne Michaels’ Broadway Video.

Irwin Entertainment also steered production for CMT's Barely Famous with The Warren Brothers, and other HBO productions, including Down and Dirty with Jim Norton, Brave New Voices, several comedy specials including Jim Norton - Monster Rain, D.L Hughley – Unapologetic, Dave Attell – Captain Miserable and Bob Saget - That Ain’t Right.

References

External links
Irwin Entertainment Home Page
IMDb Irwin Entertainment
IMDb John Irwin
Sex Rehab with Dr. Drew - VH1.com
Celebrity Rehab with Dr. Drew - VH1.com
All Jacked Up - CMT.com
Reuters 
Blabbermouth.net

Television production companies of the United States
Mass media companies established in 2004
Companies based in Los Angeles